The Garcia Wilderness is a  wilderness area within the Los Padres National Forest in San Luis Obispo County, California. 

The wilderness was created by the U.S. Congress as part of the Los Padres Condor Range and River Protection Act of 1992 (Public Law 102-301). The same legislation also established the Chumash, Machesna Mountain, Matilija, Sespe, and Silver Peak Wilderness areas. It is named for the mountain it protects, the east-west ridge of Garcia Mountain, a 3,146 ft. peak of the Santa Lucia Range. The area's vegetation includes chaparral and grasslands to oak forests. 

The main river drainages are the Salinas River and the Santa Maria River. 

There are two designated campgrounds and three hiking trails, the longest being the  Caldwell Mesa Trail.

Notes and references

 Text of Los Padres Condor Range and River Protection Act, 102-301.pdf

External links
  The Santa Maria Sun newspaper story on historic Avenales Ranch

Wilderness areas of California
Protected areas of San Luis Obispo County, California
Los Padres National Forest
Santa Lucia Ranger District, Los Padres National Forest
Santa Lucia Range
Salinas River (California)
1992 establishments in California
Protected areas established in 1992
IUCN Category Ib